ThinkPad Z60m is the second model in the Lenovo ThinkPad Z series which, as of May 2006, consisted of the 14.1" Z60t and 15.4" Z60m. These models were the first ThinkPads to feature a Widescreen (16:10) aspect ratio. All Z60m devices have integrated WiFi connectivity, a Shock Mounted hard disk drive, a Magnesium Alloy frame, and numerous other ThinkVantage Technologies. Some Z60m devices feature integrated fingerprint reader, bluetooth connectivity, and WWAN connectivity.

Select models also include a stylish titanium cover in silver colour. The laptop provides both PCMCIA and ExpressCard ports.

Specifications
 Operating System: Windows XP (Home, Professional)
 RAM: 256MB, 512MB, 768MB, or 1GB DDR2 SO-DIMM through online configuration, maximum 2GB
 Storage: 5400 RPM SATA Hard Disk in 40GB, 60GB, 80GB, or 100GB capacities, also select 7200RPM models
 Processor: Intel Pentium M 740, 750, 760 (Dothan) or Intel Celeron M
 Chipset: Intel 915PM
 Screen: WXGA (1280x800) or WSXGA+ (1680×1050) resolution color TFT
 Video: ATI Radeon X600, X300 GPU or integrated Intel GMA900
Models with ATI X300 have 64MB dedicated video memory, whereas those with the ATI X600 have 128MB dedicated video memory. Both graphics cards can also use a portion of system RAM as additional video memory while also using their dedicated memory.

References

External links
ThinkWiki On Z60m
Lenovo: ThinkPad Z60 Series

Lenovo laptops
Z60m